Please Give Me a Pair of Wings  is a 2019 Chinese television series starring Ju Jingyi and Aaron Yan with Han Dong, Zhang Yuxi, Merxat and Zhu Shengyi. It airs on iQiyi, Tencent Video and Youku on July 9, 2019.

Synopsis 
Lin Jiuge is the daughter of Shanggu's Police Commissioner who was framed and unjustly imprisoned for killing her father. With the help of young police detective Long Tianyu, she sets out to find the real murderer. 
It also follows her dream of building an all-girl school to improve the fate of the women and her budding friendship with her female cell-mates.

Cast

Main

 Ju Jingyi as Lin Jiuge
 A research graduate and daughter of Shanggu's Police Commissioner.
 Aaron Yan as Long Tianyu
 Captain of the police detective team. He has an extraordinary talent in criminal investigations and criminal tracking.
 Han Dong as Leng Liwei
 Adopted son of the Leng family. A key figure of the underworld dealings, he is Leng Shinan's right-hand-man and scapegoat. An observant and reticent man who can see through everything.
 Zhang Yuxi as Leng Nianzhi
 Young mistress of the Leng family. She has everything except love and happiness. She likes Long Tianyu.
 Merxat as Xiao Linfeng
 A talented con-artist who is well-versed in chess and different instruments. He later became the Police Warden of the Women's prison.
 Zhu Shengyi as Long Xiangxiang
 A passionate news reporter. Long Tianyu's younger sister. She likes Xiao Linfeng.

Supporting

People in prison

 Qiu Xinzhi as Tang Dezong
 Head warden of the prison. An idealistic man who wants to make the prison a better place.
 Wang Yitong as Qing Diao
 "Big bully" of the women prison. A cruel and cold person. She hates Lin Aodong as he was the one who arrested her and caused her child to become an orphan, and uses all means to torture Lin Jiuge.
 Wang Yan as Miao Yufeng
 "Big sister" of the women prison. Previously the sect leader of Qiankun Martial Arts Halls, she is a well-known figure in the pugilistic world and is known for her uprightness.
 Tao Huimin as Yu Linglong
 A famous thief known as thousand hands Buddha.
 Yi Qi as Xiao Baicai (Zhao Xiaoya)
 A timid and weak girl who is always bullied. Lin Jiuge's close friend.
 Di Lin as Da Zhima, Qing Diao's follower.
 Ran Chen as Xiao Lajiao, Qing Diao's follower.
 Zhao Jialin as Head warden.
 Zhang Yi as Yan Min, Police warden. She is strict and sarcastic.
 Zhang Zhiran as Lu Jia, Police warden. She is firm but kind.
 Han Shuo as Zhang San
 Police warden. A lecher who attempted to rape Lin Jiuge, but was accidentally killed by Lin Jiuge and Xiao Baicai.

Others

 Tse Kwan-ho as Leng Shinan
 Head of the Leng household. A customs provincial military commander. He is actually the leader of the underworld world who wields great influence and power.
 Yuan Hua as Mao Jiu
 A former gambling god. Xiao Linfeng's teacher. He was killed by Yu Damang.
 Guan Zhenhai as Sha Ye, Second head of Sha sect.
 Jiang Kai as Guan Bojun
 Lin Jiuge's birth father. A man who was framed for killing the mayor and almost committed suicide, but was saved by Lin Aodong. He then adopted a new identity and became an undercover in the crime organization.
 Wang Xin as Feng Guangdao, chief police officer. Long Tianyu's superior.
 Shen Feifan as Wu Sanshi, a policeman. Long Tianyu's assistant.
 Xiu Qing as Lin Aodong, Chief Police Officer. Lin Jiuge's adoptive father; Long Tianyu's mentor.
 Wang Yifan as Ji Zetao, a prosecutor. Long Tianyu's former classmate.
 Zhao Yue as Leng Mengchu, youngest son of the Leng family. Lin Jiuge's fiancee.
 Li Xian as Qiu Xiaoying
 Zhuang Jinghao as Wan Guochao
 Liang Jincheng as Zhang Haisheng
 Zhong Lei as Yu Damang, a man involved with the death of Lin Aodong and framing of Lin Jiuge.
 Chen Baoguo as Sha Feng
 Mao Fan as Lawyer Huangpu
 Xue Bin as Editor Ouyang
 Ge Hao as Ah Hui, a policeman who was killed by Yu Damang.
 Sun Tianxin as Da Bao, a policeman.
 Dai Luyao as Shandong Po
 Long Ni as Xiao Ying
 Lou Shushu as Jin E
 Dong Xuqian as Xiang Nan
 Xu Jin as Xiao Taohong
 Zhang Xinyu as Du Du, Tang Dezong's daughter.
 Min Chunxiao as Long Tianyu's mother.
 Lin Ruoxi as Yue Yue, Feng Guangdao's daughter.
 Shangguan Tong as Feng Guangdao's wife.
 Dan Nisi as Scar face
 Zhao Qiusheng as Hou Zi
 Jiang Xiaolin as Du Yan
 Mao Yazi as Hei Mianshen
 Sun Haoran as Zheng Wen
 Yuan Zhiying as Zheng Wu
 Du Jianqiao as Old Master Miao
 Yang Ziming as Ji Linggui

Production
The series began filming in October 2017, and wrapped up in February 2018.

Soundtrack

Awards and nominations

References 

Thriller television series
Chinese period television series
2019 web series debuts
Chinese web series
2019 Chinese television series debuts
Youku original programming
IQIYI original programming
Tencent original programming
2019 Chinese television series endings